Lakhsman Rao Jhansiwale (1904–1959) was son of Damodar Rao of Jhansi (born Anand Rao), the adopted son of Raja Gangadhar Rao and legendary Rani Laxmibai of Jhansi State.

He started using surname, Jhansiwale after the land of their forebears, Jhansi. He lived a penury life and worked as typist at Indore. The Government of Uttar Pradesh had presented a Sanad and a monetary award to him at a function held on 10 May 1957 in commemoration of his grandmother, Rani Laxmibai's, contribution in war of independence, celebrating the centenary of the Revolt of 1857. 
He died in 1959 survived by two sons Krishanrao and Chandrakantrao. The family was chief guest at felicitation ceremony on the inaugural function of Jhansi Jan Mahotsav held at Jhansi Fort in 2015.

References

1904 births
1959 deaths
20th-century Indian royalty
People from Indore
People from Jhansi
Marathi people